The Banker is a 2019 South Korean television series starring Kim Sang-joong, Chae Shi-ra, Yoo Dong-geun and Kim Tae-woo. It is based on the Japanese manga Kansayaku Nozaki Shuhei which was written by Ryouka Shuu and illustrated by Shigeru Noda from 1998 to 2002. The series aired on MBC's Wednesdays and Thursdays at 22:00 KST time slot from March 27 to May 16, 2019.

Synopsis
No Dae-ho, an honest banker, tries to fight corruption.

Cast

Main
 Kim Sang-joong as Noh Dae-ho
 Chae Shi-ra as Han Soo-ji
 Yoo Dong-geun as Kang Sam-do
 Kim Tae-woo as Lee Hae-gon

Supporting

Audit Office staff
 Ahn Woo-yeon as Seo Bo-geol
 Shin Do-hyun as Jang Mi-ho 
 Cha In-ha as Moon Hong-joo
 Kim Kyu-chul as Park Yong-soo
 Kim Byung-choon  as Han Min-gu
 Lee Yoon-sang as Cho Young-sik

Korean Bank employees
 Ahn Nae-sang as Yug Gwan-sik
 Seo Yi-sook as Do Jeong-ja
 Ju Seok-jae as Lim Chang-jae
 Oh Yong as Min Hyeong-gi
 Jung Kyung-ho as Byeon Seong-tae
 Jung Hyung-suk as Sung Chi-wook
 Lim Seung-dae as Kim Young-ho

People around Kang Sam-do
 Kim Young-pil as Secretary Kim
 Go In-beom as  Jung Soo-chan
 Kim Byung-ki as Choi Jong-soo
 Nam Myeong-lyeol as Park Jin-ho

Others
 Park Jung-hak as Bae Dong-seok
 Lee Jin-kwon as Mr. Jeong
 Ryu Sung-hyun as Park Jung-bae
 Son Jeon-geun
 Lee Mi-young
 Oh Seung-eun
 Choi Yang-rak
 Kim Byung-chun

Guests 
 Jang Gwang as Jo Jang-kwang, (Haesan Group chairman)

Production
 The first script reading took place on January 30, 2019.
 The Banker reunites Kim Sang-joong and Kim Tae-woo who previously starred together in The Jingbirok: A Memoir Of Imjin War.

Original soundtrack

Part 1

Part 2

Ratings
 In this table,  represent the lowest ratings and  represent the highest ratings.
 N/A denotes that the rating is not known.

Notes

References

External links
  
 
 

MBC TV television dramas
Korean-language television shows
2019 South Korean television series debuts
2019 South Korean television series endings
South Korean television dramas based on manga
Television series by RaemongRaein